The Sarcoma Foundation of America (SFA) is an American cancer research organization. It was founded in 2001 with the main intent of researching possible cures for sarcoma. It operates as a non-profit organization in the United States.

References 

Sarcoma

Cancer organizations based in the United States
501(c)(3) organizations